Edip Cansever (pronounced ; August 8, 1928 – May 28, 1986) was a Turkish poet.

Biography
Born in Istanbul, Turkey, Cansever attended Trade Academy for some time, and worked as an antiquity salesman in Grand Bazaar, Istanbul. Despite his denial, he is considered to be a member of second new generation:

Works
 İkindi Üstü (1947)
 Dirlik Düzenlik (1954)
 Yerçekimli Karanfil (1957)
 Umutsuzlar Parkı (1958)
 Petrol (1959)
 Nerde Antigone (1961)
 Sonrası Kalır (1964)
 Çağrılmayan Yakup (1966)
 Kirli Ağustos (1970)
 Tragedyalar (1974)
 Ben Ruhi Bey Nasılım (1976)
 Sevda ile Sezgi (1977)
 Şairin Seyir Defteri (1980)
 Yeniden (Collected Poems, 1981)
 Bezik Oynayan Kadınlar (1982)
 İlkyaz Şikayetçileri (1984)
 Oteller Kenti (1985)

Notes

 Ahmet Necdet, Modern Turk Siiri Yonelimler, Tanikliklar, Ornekler, Broy Publishing, October 1993.

External links
 A Poet Outside the "Second New Movement": Edip Cansever 
 Poems translated by Murat Nemet-Nejat
 Two Translated Poems

1928 births
1986 deaths
Writers from Istanbul
Turkish male poets
20th-century Turkish poets
Burials at Aşiyan Asri Cemetery